Long district may refer to:
Long district, Laos
Long district, Thailand